The 2005 Allan Cup was the Canadian senior ice hockey championship for the 2004–05 senior "AAA" season.  The event was hosted by the Lloydminster Border Kings in Lloydminster, Saskatchewan/Alberta.  The 2005 tournament marked the 97th year that the Allan Cup has been awarded.

This Allan Cup coincided with the 2004-05 NHL lockout which had wiped out the entire 2004-05 NHL season including the Stanley Cup Playoffs. As a result, the tournament enjoyed considerably more media coverage compared to what is typically devoted to the Allan Cup. Among the participants involved was Theoren Fleury, a former National Hockey League all-star, playing for the Horse Lake Thunder during the lockout.

Teams
Can-Am Cobras (Atlantic)
Horse Lake Thunder (Pacific)
Lloydminster Border Kings (Host)
Mid-West Islanders (West)
Montmagny Sentinelles (Quebec)
Thunder Bay Bombers (Ontario)

Results
Round Robin
Mid-West Islanders 8 - Thunder Bay Bombers 3
Lloydminster Border Kings 7 - Can-Am Cobras 0
Montmagny Sentinelles 5 - Thunder Bay Bombers 2
Horse Lake Thunder 9 - Lloydminster Border Kings 2
Horse Lake Thunder 7 - Can-Am Cobras 2
Montmagny Sentinelles 6 - Mid-West Islanders 2
Quarter-final
Mid-West Islanders 4 - Can-Am Cobras 3
Thunder Bay Bombers 5 - Lloydminster Border Kings 0
Semi-final
Thunder Bay Bombers 7 - Horse Lake Thunder 5
Montmagny Sentinelles 4 - Mid-West Islanders 1
Final
Thunder Bay Bombers 4 - Montmagny Sentinelles 3

References

External links
2005 Allan Cup website
Allan Cup website

Allan Cup
Ice hockey competitions in Saskatchewan
Sport in Lloydminster
Allan